Niko Unavalu (born 7 May 1991) is a Vanuatuan cricketer. He played in the 2013 ICC World Cricket League Division Six tournament.

References

External links
 

1991 births
Living people
Vanuatuan cricketers
Place of birth missing (living people)